Kevin Martin Krygård (born 17 May 2000) is a Norwegian professional footballer who plays for Haugesund, as a midfielder.

Career
He played youth football in Djerv 1919, before joining Haugesund in 2015. He made his senior debut in 2019.

He first became a household name in Norwegian football after two goals, one at home and one away, in the 2019–20 Europa League qualifying round. Still a part-time footballer at the time, Krygård was originally scheduled to work as a cashier at the Shell gas station and kiosk in Sveio.

Career statistics

Club

References

2000 births
Living people
Norwegian footballers
Norway youth international footballers
FK Haugesund players
Eliteserien players
Association football midfielders